This is the complete list of Asian Games medalists in athletics from 1951 to 2018.

Men

100 m

200 m

400 m

800 m

1500 m

5000 m

10,000 m

110 m hurdles

400 m hurdles

3000 m steeplechase

4 × 100 m relay

4 × 400 m relay

Marathon

10,000 m walk

20 km walk

50 km walk

High jump

Pole vault

Long jump

Triple jump

Shot put

Discus throw

Hammer throw

Javelin throw

Decathlon

Women

100 m

200 m

400 m

800 m

1500 m

3000 m

5000 m

10,000 m

100 m hurdles
 80 m hurdles: 1951–1966

400 m hurdles

3000 m steeplechase

4 × 100 m relay

4 × 400 m relay

Marathon

10,000 m walk
 10 km walk: 1986–1994

20 km walk

High jump

Pole vault

Long jump

Triple jump

Shot put

Discus throw

Hammer throw

Javelin throw

Heptathlon
 Pentathlon: 1966–1978

Mixed

4 × 400 m relay

See also

References
Asian Games – GBR Athletics
Women's relay medallists. Incheon2014.
Men's relay medallists. Incheon2014.

Athletics
medalists

Asian Games